George M. Fay (1909–1957) was a 20th-century American lawyer who twice served as United States Attorney for the District of Columbia, first in 1946, then 1947–1951.

Background

George Morris Fay was born on May 22, 1909, in Pittston, Pennsylvania.  His parents were William Michael Fay and Caroline Runner.  In 1931, he received a BA from Georgetown University and in 1935 a Bachelors of Law.

Career

Early years
Fay started his career in the law firm of Fay & Anderson.

In 1935, Fay joined the Bureau of War Risk Litigation at the U.S. Department of Justice.  In 1940, he joined its criminal division.

In 1944, he joined the United States Naval Reserves as a lieutenant through 1946.

U.S. Attorney General

In 1946, he became special assistant to the U.S. Attorney General. Later that year, he received an interim appointment as United States Attorney for the District of Columbia  In 1947, he was reappointed and confirmed by the United States Senate and served until 1951.

Starting in 1946, Fay cracked down on sex crimes in the area.  "We saw a parade of sex offenses coming in–and nothing could be done. There was no law." Instead, sex crimes–molestation, solicitation, homosexuality–all resulted in disorderly conduct.

On August 26, 1948, shortly after "Confrontation Day" when Alger Hiss and Whittaker Chambers met publicly for the first time during testimony before the House Un-American Activities Committee, Fay expressed interest in pursuing a perjury charge against one of the two men.

In 1949, Fay had eight restaurants in Washington, DC, raided for illegal gambling.

Personal and death

In 1936, Fay married Dorothy M. Donovan.  They had five children, Dorothy, Lynn, Joan, William and Gerard.

Fay was a Democrat and member of the American Federal and District of Columbia Bar associations, the Bar of the Supreme Court of the United States, and the Metropolitan Club.

Fay died age 48 on November 17, 1957.

See also

 United States Attorney
 United States District Court for the District of Columbia
 Alger Hiss-Whittaker Chambers Case

References

United States Attorneys for the District of Columbia
1909 births
1957 deaths
People from Pittston, Pennsylvania
Georgetown University alumni
United States Navy reservists
20th-century American lawyers
Georgetown University Law Center alumni